Thomas Settle (March 10, 1865 – January 20, 1919) was an American lawyer and member of the U.S. House of Representatives from North Carolina.

Settle was the son of Thomas Settle, a judge and politician in North Carolina, and a grandson of Thomas Settle (1789–1857), also a U.S. Representative from North Carolina.

Settle was born near Wentworth, Rockingham County, N.C., on March 10, 1865.  He attended the public schools and Georgetown University, studied law in Greensboro, N.C.; was admitted to the bar in 1885 and commenced practice in Wentworth.  Settle served as solicitor of the ninth judicial district (1886–1894) before he was elected as a Republican to the Fifty-third and Fifty-fourth Congresses (March 4, 1893 – March 3, 1897).  Settle was chairman of the Committee on Expenditures on Public Buildings during the Fifty-fourth Congress.  He was an unsuccessful candidate for reelection in 1896.  He resumed the practice of law in Asheville, N.C.; was appointed by the Department of Justice as special attorney to the United States Court of Customs in New York City in 1909, and served in that capacity until 1910.

Like his father before him, Settle ran unsuccessfully for Governor of North Carolina.  As the Republican nominee in 1912, he came in third behind winner Locke Craig and Progressive Party nominee Iredell Meares.

Settle died in Asheville, NC, on January 20, 1919. He is buried in Oakdale Cemetery, Wilmington, N.C.

Notes

External links
 
 

1865 births
1919 deaths
Georgetown University alumni
Republican Party members of the United States House of Representatives from North Carolina
People from Wentworth, North Carolina
Thomas
19th-century American politicians
Burials at Oakdale Cemetery